Eremo di San Bartolomeo in Legio (Italian for Hermitage of San Bartolomeo in Legio) is an hermitage located in Roccamorice, Province of Pescara, in the  Abruzzo region of  Italy.

History

Architecture

References

External links

 

Bartolomeo in Legio
Roccamorice